Frank Calvelli is an American intelligence official who is the assistant secretary of the Air Force for space acquisition and integration (SAF/SQ). He previously served as the principal deputy director of the National Reconnaissance Office from 2012 to 2020. In 2021, he joined Booz Allen Hamilton as senior vice president.

Education 
Calvelli earned a Bachelor of Science degree from the State University of New York at Potsdam and a Master of Business Administration the Loyola University Maryland.

Career 
Calvelli served for over 30 years in the Central Intelligence Agency, where he was assigned to the National Reconnaissance Office. From July 6, 2012 to October 5, 2020, he served as deputy director of the NRO. He joined Booz Allen Hamilton's national security program as senior vice president in 2021.

In December 2021, Joe Biden nominated Calvelli to serve as the first assistant secretary of the Air Force for space acquisition and integration.

References 

Living people
State University of New York at Potsdam alumni
Loyola University Maryland alumni
People of the Central Intelligence Agency
National Reconnaissance Office personnel
Year of birth missing (living people)
Biden administration personnel